The 2018 Coates Hire Newcastle 500 was a motor racing event for the Supercars Championship, held on the weekend of 23 to 25 November 2018. The event was held on the Newcastle Street Circuit in Newcastle East, New South Wales and consisted of two races, 250 kilometres in length. It was the sixteenth and final event in the 2018 Supercars Championship and hosted Races 30 and 31 of the season.

Results

Race 30

Race

 Van Gisbergen received a 25 second post-race penalty for a pit-lane infringement.
 Waters received a 15 second post-race penalty for a driving infringement.

Race 31
Race

References

Newcastle 500
Newcastle 500
Newcastle 500